Sin Frenos (Without Brakes) is the fourth and final studio album release from the Spanish music duo, La 5ª Estación. The album received a Grammy Award for "Best Latin Pop Album" in 2010.

Album information
During the summer of 2008, the release of Sin Frenos was set for October. Throughout the end of 2008, rumors circulated of a break-up of the then three members of La 5ª Estación, but were denied by the group's vocalist Natalia Jiménez. In December, the release of the CD was confirmed for March 2009, along with the confirmation that long-time member Pablo Domínguez (guitar and bass) would leave the group to join a group named Siete Horas. The first single Que te Quería was released on January 5, 2009, later releasing a music video for the song on January 21. Natalia Jiménez described the new CD as a little different still retaining their Pop/Rock style, but having half the tracks be more rockish and less gloomy and the other half a more Latin Mexican sound.  The CD included 12 songs, half from Ángel Reyero (guitar) and half from Natalia Jiménez. Four songs: Que Te Quería, Mis Labios Por Tus Piernas, Esta Noche No, and Sin Salida were produced by Tom Lord Alge. The CD contains a duet with Marc Anthony titled Recuérdame. The iTunes edition of the album included a bonus pre-order track titled Es Cierto. The album received a 2009 Latin Grammy nomination for Best Pop Album by a Duo/Group with Vocals.

Track listing

Track listing confirmed on CDUniverse.com

Singles

Release history

Charts and certifications

Charts

Certifications

Accolades
Sin Frenos was nominated in the 2009 Latin Grammy Awards for best record by a Pop duo/group, but lost to Reik's Un Dia Más. On January 31, 2010, the album toke home the Grammy Award for Best Latin Pop Album. It also received the "Pop Album of the Year" award at the Premio Lo Nuestro 2010 awards.

References

2009 albums
La 5ª Estación albums
Grammy Award for Best Latin Pop Album